The College of Agriculture and Renewable Natural Resources (CANR) is one of the six colleges of Kwame Nkrumah University of Science and Technology in Ghana.

CANR was founded in January 2005 after the release of revised university statuses in December 2004. It emerged from the former Faculty of Agriculture, the Institute of Renewable Natural Resources, and the School of Forestry.

CANR has a total of 13 academic departments with a student population of about 2000, an academic staff of about 90, and about 130 supporting staff.

About the College 
CANR was established in January 2005, after the release of the revised university statutes in December 2004. It was formed from the former Faculty of Agriculture, the Institute of Renewable Natural Resources and the School of Forestry, Sunyani.

CANR is mandated to train and equip graduates with the requisite academic and entrepreneurial skills in the areas of agricultural production and natural resource management for sustainable national development, in addition to carrying out research and extension services in these areas.

Academics 
CANR is involved in a number of collaborative researches with National and International Institutions and Organizations such as FORIG, MOFA, Forestry Commission, ICRA, and CIDA among others.

Faculties & Departments 
Located at the west end of the University campus, CANR houses two Faculties:

Faculty of Agriculture 
 Department of Agricultural Economics, Agribusiness and Extension
 Department of Animal Science
 Department of Crop and Soil Sciences
 Department of Horticulture

Faculty of Renewable Natural Resources 
 Department of Agroforestry
 Department of Fisheries and Watershed Management
 Department of Silviculture and Forest Management
 Department of Wildlife and Range Management
 Department of Wood Science and Technology

Research Centres 
In addition to the Faculties, CANR has four(4) Research Centres:
 Bureau of Integrated Rural Development (BIRD).
 Centre for Biodiversity Utilisation and Development (CBUD).
 Dairy/Beef cattle Research Station, Boadi.
 Agriculture Research Station, Anwomaso.

Programmes 
CANRs offers undergraduate programmes leading to the award of a Bachelor of Science degree as well as postgraduate programmes leading to the award of MSc, MPhil or PhD degrees.

Undergraduate Programmes 
BSc degrees are awarded by tCANR's Faculties with specialisation options in the departments in those Faculties.
 BSc Agriculture
 BSc Natural Resources Management
 BSc Post Harvest Technology
 BSc Forest Resources Technology
BSc Agriculture Biotechnology 
BSc Landscape Design and Management 
BSc Agribusiness and Management
 BSc Aquaculture and Water Resources Management
 BSc Meat and Dairy

Postgraduate Programmes 
The college runs the following postgraduate programmes.
 MSc Agroforestry
 MSc Wood Technology and Management
 MPhil and PhD programmes are run in all Departments of the Faculty of Agriculture

References 

Agricultural universities and colleges
Kwame Nkrumah University of Science and Technology